Claude Barras (born 1973) is a Swiss director, producer, and writer.

Barras was born in Sierre, Switzerland. He studied illustration and computer graphics at Emile Cohl School in Lyon and 3D infographics at ECAL. He then received a degree in anthropology and digital images from Lumiere University. He works as a freelance illustrator in Geneva. 

After his studies, Barras and his friend Cédric Louis co-founded Hélium Films. Under this production company, they’ve co-produced and sometimes co-directed multiple animated short films. Many of their films, like Land of the Heads (2008), have received awards and critical acclaim at numerous festivals.

Throughout his career, Barras directed several short films, including The Genie in a Ravioli Can (2006). Barras' first full-length animated feature, My Life as a Courgette (2016), was presented at the Director's Fortnight of the Cannes Film Festival and received numerous awards at film festivals around the world. Switzerland submitted the film as a foreign-language entry for the 89th Academy Awards. It was nominated for Best Animated Feature Film of the Year but did not win.

Filmography
In addition to directing, Barras has co-produced many of his films. He has also co-produced several other films, not by him. This includes La femme canon (2017), Birdz (2016), Imposter (2014), Un enfant commode (2013), and Monsieur l’assassin X (2012).

Feature films

Short films

Accolades

My Life as a Courgette (2016)
 Cannes Film Festival, Directors' Fortnight (Quinzaine des réalisateurs) – May 2016
 International Animation Film Festival, Annecy, Official competition – June 2016 / PUBLIC PRIZE AND CRISTAL FOR BEST FEATURE FILM
 MIFF – Melbourne International Film Festival, (1st international screening) – July 2016 /AUDIENCE AWARD
 FFA – Festival du film francophone d'Angoulême, Compétition – August 2016 / GRAND PRIX (Valois de Diamant)
 TIFF – Toronto Internanational Film Festival – September 2016

The Genie in a Ravioli Can (2006)
 Anvers, European Youth Film Festival of Flanders, Best Short Film 2007
 Bristol, Encounters Short Film and Animation Festival, New Talent Award 2006
 Genève, Animatou Festival international du film d'animation – Genève, Prix du public Kodak, Meilleur court métrage 2006
 Genève 11, FROG – Festival du Film Romand à Genève, Mention spéciale 2006
 Melbourne, Australian International Film Festival, The Golden Spotlight Award – Best Short Film 2006
 Santiago de Compostela, Santiago de Compostela – Festival Int. de Curta CURTOCIRCUITO, «Kodak 35 mm» Award for the Best Short Film shot on 35 mm 2006
 Solothurn, Solothurner Filmtage, Prix du Public SSA/Suissimage 2006

References

External links

Rita Productions
Swiss films

Swiss film directors
Swiss animated film directors
Swiss animated film producers
Swiss film producers
1973 births
Living people
People from Sierre
Swiss animators